Upside Downside is the second studio album by guitarist Mike Stern, released in 1986 through Atlantic Records and reissued on August 21, 2007 through Wounded Bird Records.

Track listing

Personnel
Musicians
Mike Stern – guitar, arrangement
Mitchel Forman – piano, synthesizer
Dave Weckl – drums (except track 4)
Dr. Gibbs – percussion
Mark Egan – bass (except tracks 2, 4)
Jeff Andrews – bass (track 2), co-arrangement (track 6)
David Sanborn – alto saxophone (track 3)
Bob Berg – tenor saxophone (except track 3)
Jaco Pastorius – bass (track 4)
Steve Jordan – drums (track 4)

Production
Hiram Bullock – producer
John Snyder – executive producer
Doug Epstein – engineer
Mike Krowiak – engineer (assisted)
Greg Calbi – mastering engineer

References

External links
In Review: Mike Stern "Upside Downside" at Guitar Nine Records

Mike Stern albums
1986 albums
Atlantic Records albums